Islom Zoirov ,(),( born 12 January 2002) is a Tajikistani professional football player who is currently banned.

Career

Club
In February 2020, Zoirov went on trial with Spartak-2 Moscow.

On 10 February 2021, Istiklol announced that Zoirov had joined the club on trial, before being announced as having signed for the club on 29 March 2021.

International
Zoirov captained the Tajikistan U17 team at the 2019 FIFA U-17 World Cup in Brazil.

Zoirov made his senior team debut on 7 November 2020 against Bahrain.

Career statistics

Club

International

Statistics accurate as of match played 29 March 2022

Scores and results list Tajikistan's goal tally first.

Honours
Istiklol
 Tajikistan Higher League (1): 2021
 Tajik Supercup (1): 2022

References

2002 births
Living people
Tajikistani footballers
Tajikistan international footballers
Association football forwards
Tajikistan youth international footballers